Leptospermum divaricatum is a species of plant that is endemic to inland New South Wales. It is an erect or weeping shrub with compact fibrous bark, elliptical to egg-shaped leaves, white flowers arranged singly on short axillary side shoots and woody fruit that fall off when mature.

Description
It has rough, compact, fibrous bark on the older stems, the younger stems thin and covered with fine hairs.

Taxonomy
This species was formally described in 1843 by Johannes Conrad Schauer in Walper's book Repertorium Botanices Systematicae. The specific epithet (divaricatum) is a Latin word meaning "widely spreading" or "forked".

Distribution and habitat
Leptospermum divaricatum grows in woodland and heath in mallee or on hillsides on the North West Slopes, Central Western Slopes and Western Plains of New South Wales, south from Nymagee.

References

divaricatum
Myrtales of Australia
Flora of New South Wales
Plants described in 1843